is a Japanese mixed martial artist, currently competes in the Welterweight division for the ONE Championship.

Mixed martial arts career

Early career 
Tetsuka made his professional MMA debut in 2015 against Shotaro Abe at Pancrase 271 on 1 November 2015. he won a fight via knockout in the first round.

Tetsuka faced Kenta Takagi in a rematch and for the interim Pancrase Welterweight Championship at Pancrase 306 on 30 June 2019. He won the bout via rear-naked choke submission in the first round. Later Tetsuka promoted to undisputed champion and vacated the title when he signed with the ONE Championship.

ONE Championship
Tetsuka his promotional debut against Hernani Perpétuo at ONE: Century on 13 October 2019 as a competition Shooto vs. Pancrase. He won the fight via unanimous decision.

Tetsuka faced Gunther Kalunda Ngunza at Road to ONE 3: Tokyo Fight Night on 10 September 2020. He won the fight via TKO in the first round.

Tetsuka faced Murad Ramazanov at ONE: Inside the Matrix 3 on 13 November 2020. He lost the fight via unanimous decision.

Tetsuka faced former ONE Welterweight title challenger Agilan Thani at ONE: NextGen 2 on 12 November 2021. He won the fight via TKO in the third round.

Tetsuka was scheduled to face former ONE Welterweight World Champion Zebaztian Kadestam at ONE: Only the Brave on 28 January 2022. However, Kadestam forced to withdraw due to a non-COVID related illness and he was replaced by Edson Marques. He won the fight via knockout in the third round.

Championships and accomplishments
Pancrase
Pancrase Welterweight Champion (One time)
Interim Pancrase Welterweight Champion (One time)

Mixed martial arts record

|-
| Win
| align=center| 11–4
| Edson Marques
| KO (punch)
| ONE: Only the Brave
| 
| align=center| 3
| align=center| 1:05
| Kallang, Singapore
| 
|-
| Win
| align=center| 10–4
| Agilan Thani
| TKO (punches)
| ONE: NextGen 2
| 
| align=center| 3
| align=center| 3:45
| Kallang, Singapore
| 
|-
| Loss
| align=center| 9–4
| Murad Ramazanov 
| Decision (unanimous)
| ONE: Inside the Martix 3
| 
| align=center| 3
| align=center| 5:00
| Kallang, Singapore 
|
|-
| Win
| align=center| 9–3
| Gunther Kalunda Ngunza
| TKO (punches)
| Road to ONE 3: Tokyo Fight Night
| 
| align=center| 1
| align=center| 1:14
| Tokyo, Japan
| 
|-
| Win
| align=center| 8–3
| Hernani Perpétuo
| Decision (unanimous)
| ONE: Century
| 
| align=center| 3
| align=center| 5:00
| Tokyo, Japan
|  
|-
| Win
| align=center| 7–3
| Kenta Takagi
| Submission (rear-naked choke)
| Pancrase 306
| 
| align=center| 1
| align=center| 3:36
| Tokyo, Japan
| 
|-
| Win
| align=center| 6–3
| Akihiro Murayama
| Decision (unanimous)
| Pancrase 302
| 
| align=center| 3
| align=center| 5:00
| Tokyo, Japan
| 
|-
| Win
| align=center| 5–3
| Toshikazu Suzuki
| TKO (punches)
| Pancrase 298
| 
| align=center| 3
| align=center| 1:18
| Tokyo, Japan
| 
|-
| Loss
| align=center| 4–3
| Glaico França
| Decision (split)
| Pancrase 293
| 
| align=center| 3
| align=center| 5:00
| Tokyo, Japan
|
|-
| Win
| align=center| 4–2
| Sergey Kulik
| TKO (punches)
| Pancrase 290
| 
| align=center| 2
| align=center| 2:04
| Tokyo, Japan
| 
|-
| Win
| align=center| 3–2
| Yuta Nakamura
| TKO (punches)
| Pancrase 286
| 
| align=center| 3
| align=center| 1:36
| Tokyo, Japan
| 
|-
| Loss
| align=center| 2–2
| Kenta Takagi
| TKO (doctor stoppage)
| Pancrase 279
| 
| align=center| 2
| align=center| 0:25
| Tokyo, Japan
| 
|-
| Loss
| align=center| 2–1
| Luiz Dutra Jr.
| Decision (unanimous)
| Pancrase 276
| 
| align=center| 3
| align=center| 5:00
| Tokyo, Japan
| 
|-
| Win
| align=center| 2–0
| Makoto Kawawa
| KO (punch)
| Pancrase 275
| 
| align=center| 1
| align=center| 0:10
| Tokyo, Japan
|
|-
| Win
| align=center| 1–0
| Shotaro Abe 
| KO (punch)
| Pancrase 271
| 
| align=center| 1
| align=center| 0:10
| Tokyo, Japan
| 
|-

See also
List of current ONE fighters

Notes

References

External links 
 Hiroyuki Tetsuka at ONE Championship
 

1990 births
Living people
Japanese male mixed martial artists
Welterweight mixed martial artists
Middleweight mixed martial artists
Mixed martial artists utilizing wrestling
Japanese male judoka